Same-sex marriage in Alagoas has been legal since 6 January 2012. Alagoas was the first Brazilian state to legalize same-sex marriage. Civil unions (união estável) have also been available since 2011.

Legal history
On 7 December 2011, Judge James Magalhães de Medeiros of the Alagoas Judicial Administrative Department instructed the state's civil registry offices to process marriage applications from same-sex couples in an identical manner to opposite-sex couples. The decision, known as "Provision N° 40", came into effect upon publication on 6 January 2012. This made Alagoas the first state in Brazil to open marriage to same-sex couples. Civil unions have been legally performed and recognized nationwide, including in Alagoas, since May 2011 in accordance with a ruling from the Supreme Federal Court.

On 17 January 2012, a male couple who had been together for almost 25 years became the second same-sex couple to marry in the state, and the first to do so since the new ruling. In July 2011, a lesbian couple was able to have their civil union converted into a marriage by a judge in Maceió.

Marriage statistics
The following table shows the number of same-sex marriages performed in Alagoas according to the Brazilian Institute of Geography and Statistics.

Figures for 2020 are lower than previous years because of the restrictions in place due to the COVID-19 pandemic.

See also
 LGBT rights in Alagoas
 Same-sex marriage in Brazil

References

Alagoas
Alagoas
Alagoas
2012 in LGBT history